Felezi Bridge (literally Steel Bridge) is a bridge in Isfahan, Iran, the first modern bridge built in the city, during the 1950s, over the Zayandeh River.

References 

Bridges in Isfahan
Bridges in Iran
1950s establishments in Iran